The Meeting is a 1955 comedy film about the love of an Uzbek woman and an Azerbaijani. The film premiered on August 6, 1956, in Moscow.

Plot 
The picture tells about the friendship between competing collective farmers-cotton growers of Azerbaijan and Uzbekistan, in the center of which is the love of the Uzbek woman Lala and the Azerbaijani Kamil. The love of the protagonist of the film for the heroine of labor Lale turned him from a careless and lazy guy into a production leader ...

Cast 
Arif Mirzakuliev - Kamil
Nellya Ataullaeva - Lala
Leyla Badirbeyli - Bilgeis
Hasanaga Salaev - Musa
Munavvar Kalantarli – Minaver
Aliagha Aghayev - Shikhali
Aghahuseyn Javadov - Abulfas
Barat Shakinskaya - Shovket
Sona Aslanova - Firangiz (duplicated by Alexander Kharitonova)
Aziza Mammadova - Aziza
Mammadali Velikhanly - Chaychi
M. Norbaev - Niyaz
Fateh Fatullayev - Guluzade
Susan Mejidova
Mustafa Mardanov - Asker
Mukhlis Janizade - Anwar
R. Mirzoeva - Almaz
Jabbar Aliyev - Sharip

References 

Azerbaijani-language films
1955 comedy films
1955 films
Azerbaijani black-and-white films
Azerbaijani comedy films